Roy Eric Carlson (June 24, 1918 – November 14, 1995) was an American football and baseball coach.
After serving as an assistant coach at Washington State University from 1959 to 1961, he served as the head football coach at Pacific Lutheran University from 1962 to 1971. He also served as the school's baseball coach from 1963 to 1965.

Head coaching record

Football

References

External links
 

1918 births
1995 deaths
Pacific Lutheran Lutes baseball coaches
Pacific Lutheran Lutes football coaches
Washington Huskies football players
Washington State Cougars football coaches
Sportspeople from Chicago
Players of American football from Chicago